The Bigfoot Trail is an unofficial U.S. long-distance hiking trail in northern California. The Bigfoot Trail was originally proposed by Michael Kauffmann in 2009 as a suggested route to navigate the Klamath Mountains from south to north as well as a long-trail to introduce nature lovers to the biodiversity of the Klamath Mountains region. The trail begins in the Yolla Bolly-Middle Eel Wilderness and ends in Redwood National Park at the Pacific Ocean near Crescent City, California. The route crosses six wilderness areas, one National Park, and one State Park. Northwest California's Klamath Mountains foster one of the most diverse temperate coniferous forests on Earth, and this route is intended to be a celebration of that biodiversity.

Route 
The Pacific Crest Trail briefly coincides with the Bigfoot Trail in the northern Marble Mountain Wilderness and north of Seiad Valley to the edge of the Red Buttes Wilderness. Due to the strenuous nature of the trail and the fact that some sections have been un-maintained for many years it is not a trail that can be hiked quickly. Experience using map and compass as well as the ability to read the landscape are necessary for a successful thru-hike. 

The trail passes through these areas, listed south to north:
Mendocino National Forest
Yolla Bolly-Middle Eel Wilderness
Shasta-Trinity National Forest
Trinity Alps Wilderness
Klamath National Forest
Russian Wilderness
Marble Mountain Wilderness
Red Buttes Wilderness
Siskiyou Wilderness
Six Rivers National Forest
Siskiyou Wilderness
Smith River National Recreation Area
Jedediah Smith Redwoods State Park
Redwood National Park

Flora
The botanical diversity exists in northwest California because of the interactions of a variety of factors that have remained "consistent" for millions of years. Northwest California is a museum of sorts, hiding relicts of epochs gone by, called paleoendemics, and fostering the growth of new species, called neoendemics, in unusual nooks created by complex climate and soils. These small microclimates, linked with isolation in space and time, create this unique setting.

Northwest California is an ancient meeting ground—having a central location and continuity with other mountain ranges as well as a proximity to the Pacific Ocean. While there are many endemic plants in northwest California, the endemic and relict conifers are of particular interest and importance because there is so much diversity in such a small area. There are 3,540 vascular plant taxa (species, subspecies, and variations) of plants—and as many as 38 species of conifers depending on where one delineates northwest California  The Klamath Mountains fosters one of the most diverse temperate coniferous forests on Earth and the Bigfoot Trail is in place to visit and celebrate that diversity.

Geology

For the majority of the route, the Bigfoot Trail is in the Klamath Mountains. Topographically, the Klamath Mountains are part of the set of coastal ranges that run roughly parallel to the Pacific Ocean in California and Oregon, but the Klamath Mountains differ in history, complexity, and geological character. In fact, the Klamath Mountains' closest geological connection is to the Sierra Nevada (U.S.). While most of northwest California can geologically be referred to as the Klamath Mountain Province, the region also presents a coastal area called the North California Coast Range. The first 27 miles and final 16 miles traverse the Coast Range (here defined as the Franciscan Complex). This geologic region also has its share of interesting botanical rarities.

The geology of northwest California has helped foster the regions high plant species diversity. Complex soils of the Klamath Mountains have helped create a spectrum of subtle microclimates in which plant species have been able to "hide out" and evolve.

Climate

On a grand scale, the area is comfortable for plant growth compared to other areas of the West—there is a moderate climate. The region fosters three distinct climatic gradients.  First, there is a north-to-south trend of decreasing winter precipitation and warmer summer temperatures. Second, there is a west to east trend away from cooler and moister summer temperatures to a warmer, drier environment. Third, a montane gradient is expressed in which temperature decreases and precipitation increases with elevation. While in California's Mediterranean climate it is difficult to calculate an "average" level of precipitation—as fluctuations from year to year are common—northwest California offers more year-to-year stability than any other place in the state. These climatic gradients contribute to the plant diversity of the region—and the botanical rarities that can be seen along the Bigfoot Trail. Because the trail traverses varied topography by first traveling in a south to north direction and then east to west, many of northwest California's common and unique vegetation types are visited.

References

External links
Bigfoottrail.org: official Bigfoot Trail website
Bigfoot Trail Alliance
Facebook.com; Group for Bigfoot Trail Advocacy
Traildino.com: Bigfoot Trail Description
Conifercountry.com: Conifers of Northwest California

Hiking trails in California
Long-distance trails in the United States
Klamath Mountains
Protected areas of Del Norte County, California
Protected areas of Siskiyou County, California
Protected areas of Tehama County, California
Protected areas of Trinity County, California
Klamath National Forest
Mendocino National Forest
Redwood National and State Parks
Shasta-Trinity National Forest
Six Rivers National Forest
2009 establishments in California